Frank A. Hall House is a historic home located at Westfield in Chautauqua County, New York. It is a two-story stuccoed brick Italian Villa style dwelling built about 1855. It is characterized by an asymmetrical massing of wings surrounding a three-story central tower.

It was listed on the National Register of Historic Places in 1983.

References

Houses on the National Register of Historic Places in New York (state)
Italianate architecture in New York (state)
Houses completed in 1855
Houses in Chautauqua County, New York
National Register of Historic Places in Chautauqua County, New York